Sir John Morgan, 4th Baronet  (11 July 1710 – 1767), of Kinnersley Castle, Herefordshire, was a British Tory politician who sat in the House of Commons between 1734 and 1767.

Morgan was the only son of Sir Thomas Morgan, 3rd Baronet. He succeeded to the baronetcy on the death of his father on 14 December 1716. He was educated at Westminster School in 1721 and matriculated at Queen’s College, Oxford 1726 
   
At the 1734 British general election, Morgan was returned   as a Tory Member of Parliament for Hereford. He  voted with the Opposition. He did not stand in 1741.

Morgan married Anne Jackobson, daughter of Sir Jacob Jackobson, of Walthamstow, Essex, director of the South Sea Company,  on 17 December 1750. He was High Sheriff of Herefordshire for the year 1752 to 1753.

Morgan was returned unopposed for Herefordshire at a by-election on  5 May 1755. He was unopposed again at the 1761 British general election    He voted against the Grenville Administration over general warrants, in February 1764. He did not vote against the repeal of the Stamp Act but voted against Chatham’s Administration on the land tax. He is not known to have spoken in the House.

Morgan died without issue on 29 April 1767 and the baronetcy became extinct.

References

1710 births
1767 deaths
British MPs 1734–1741
British MPs 1754–1761
British MPs 1761–1768
Members of the Parliament of Great Britain for English constituencies
Baronets in the Baronetage of England